There have been three baronetcies created for members of the Farquhar family, one in the Baronetage of Great Britain and two in the Baronetage of the United Kingdom. One creation is extant as of 2008.

The Farquhar Baronetcy -- of Cadogan House in the County of Middlesex—was created in the Baronetage of Great Britain on 1 March 1796 for Walter Farquhar, Physician to George IV when Prince of Wales and subsequently President of the Royal College of Physicians. Sir Harold Farquhar, grandson of Harvie Morton Farquhar, second son of the second Baronet, was a diplomat and served as British Ambassador to Sweden between 1948 and 1951.

The Townsend-Farquhar Baronetcy, of Mauritius, was created in the Baronetage of the United Kingdom on 21 August 1821 for Robert Townsend-Farquhar, the first Governor of Mauritius and Member of Parliament for Newton and Hythe. He was the second son of the first Baronet of the 1796 creation. The second Baronet represented Hertford in the House of Commons. The title became extinct on the death of the sixth Baronet in 1924.

The Farquhar Baronetcy, of Cavendish Square in the parish of St Marylebone in the County of London, was created in the Baronetage of the United Kingdom on 25 October 1892 for Horace Farquhar. He was the fifth son of the second Baronet of the 1821 creation. For more information on this creation, see the Earl Farquhar.

Farquhar baronets, of Cadogan House (1796)
Sir Walter Farquhar, 1st Baronet (1738–1819)
Sir Thomas Harvie Farquhar, 2nd Baronet (1775–1836)
Sir Walter Rockliffe Farquhar, 3rd Baronet (1810–1900)
Sir Henry Thomas Farquhar, 4th Baronet (1838–1916)
Sir Walter Randolph Fitzroy Farquhar, 5th Baronet (1878–1918)
Sir Peter Walter Farquhar, 6th Baronet (1904–1986)
Sir Michael Fitzroy Henry Farquhar, 7th Baronet (born 1938)

Townsend-Farquhar baronets, of Mauritius (1821)
Sir Robert Townsend Townsend-Farquhar, 1st Baronet (1776–1830)
Sir Walter Minto Townsend-Farquhar, 2nd Baronet (1809–1866)
Sir Eric Robert Townsend-Farquhar, 3rd Baronet (1836–1867)
Sir Minto Walter Townsend-Farquhar, 4th Baronet (1837–1872)
Sir John Henry Townsend-Farquhar, 5th Baronet (1839–1877)
Sir Robert Townsend-Farquhar, 6th Baronet (1841–1924)

Farquhar baronets, of Cavendish Square (1892)
see the Earl Farquhar

References

Kidd, Charles, Williamson, David (editors). Debrett's Peerage and Baronetage (1990 edition). New York: St Martin's Press, 1990, 

Baronetcies in the Baronetage of Great Britain
Extinct baronetcies in the Baronetage of the United Kingdom
1796 establishments in Great Britain
1821 establishments in the United Kingdom